James Bland may refer to:
 James Bland (priest), English-born Anglican priest in Ireland
 James Bland (actor) (born 1985), American actor, writer, director, and producer
 James A. Bland (1854–1911), American musician, song writer, and minstrel performer
 James W. D. Bland (1838–1870), African-American politician from Virginia